Poly Styrene: I Am a Cliché is a 2021 documentary film about Poly Styrene, the lead singer of X-Ray Spex. Directed by Celeste Bell and Paul Sng, the film features Bell, Poly Styrene's daughter, exploring her mother's history and legacy through archival footage and interviews with her peers and fans.

The film features narration of Poly Styrene's personal diaries by actress Ruth Negga.

The film premiered at the Glasgow Film Festival on 27 February 2021, in advance of its commercial release on a digital platform on 5 March.

Reception

Critical response

Accolades
At the British Independent Film Awards 2021, the film won the award for Best Documentary and the Raindance Discovery Award.

The film was the winner of the Documentary Award at the 2021 Whistler Film Festival.

References

External links

2021 films
2021 documentary films
British documentary films
Documentary films about women in music
2020s English-language films
2020s British films